Chemrey is a village in the Leh district of Ladakh, India. It is located in the Kharu tehsil. The Chemrey Monastery is located in this village.

Demographics
According to the 2011 census of India, Chemrey has 353 households. The effective literacy rate (i.e. the literacy rate of population excluding children aged 6 and below) is 91.12%.

References

Villages in Kharu tehsil